Associazione Sportiva Dilettantistica Cerea Calcio 1912 or simply Cerea is an Italian association football club based in Cerea, Veneto. Cerea currently plays in Eccellenza Veneto.

History

Foundation 
The club was founded in 1912.

Serie D 
In the season 2010–11 from Eccellenza Veneto Group A it was ranked 2nd and promoted for the first time to Serie D by repechage.

In the season 2011–12 in Serie D/D it was ranked 9th. Cerea was relegated in 2013.

Colors and badge 
The team's color are white and dark red.

Stadium
It plays in Stadio Pelaloca in Cerea, which has a capacity of 2.000 seats.

External links
 Official homepage 

Association football clubs established in 1912
Football clubs in Veneto
1912 establishments in Italy